The Lambs is a 1996 Swiss drama film directed by Marcel Schüpbach. The film was selected as the Swiss entry for the Best Foreign Language Film at the 69th Academy Awards, but was not accepted as a nominee.

Cast
 Richard Berry as Le père
 Brigitte Roüan as La mère
 Julia Maraval as Marie
 Alexis Tomassian as Daniel
 Noémie Kocher as Nadia

See also
 List of submissions to the 69th Academy Awards for Best Foreign Language Film
 List of Swiss submissions for the Academy Award for Best Foreign Language Film

References

External links
 

1996 films
1996 drama films
1990s French-language films
Swiss drama films
French-language Swiss films
Films produced by Jacques Perrin